Yves Grosrichard (1907-1992) was a 20th-century French journalist who led an important role in the editing press in France after the Second World War.

Biography 
Bachelor of Arts, Grosrichard began in the same newspaper as parliamentary editor in 1931. He arrived in Le Canard Enchaîné in 1935. During the Second World War, he took up a post at the National éducation. He became professor of [French] at the Turgot College from 1940 to 1943, and at the Lavoisier superior primary school from 1 October 1944. He joined the French Resistance: He was arrested on December 10, 1943, by the Germans at his home, then incarcerated in Fresnes Prison for an unknown period. He headed the Foreign Policy Service of France-Soir and in 1953 he left Le Canard Enchaîné to devote himself entirely to this newspaper. He multiplied the collaborations at the Liberation: L'Ordre, Carrefour, Ambiance, La Bataille, La France intérieure, La Voix de Paris, France-Soir. He was the editor-in-chief of the « Journal parlé » de la  from 1944 to 1946. He died in 1992.

Bibliography 
1953: Zèbre. Gallimard
1956: La compagne de l'homme. Gallimard
1958: L'Amérique insolite. Nouvelle Revue Française, series "l'Air du Temps."
1961: Le haut du pavé. Gallimard
1967: Histoire de la Guerre 1939-1945. Hachette, (under the direction of Pierre Lazareff)
1970: Les 100 visages de Bismarck, Presses de la Cité

References

External links 
 Yves Grosrichard à propos de l'égalité des hommes et des femmes on INA.fr (3 February 1966)
 Yves Grosrichard on the site of Gallimard

20th-century French journalists
French Resistance members
Writers from Paris
1907 births
1992 deaths